The statue of Louis Pasteur is installed in Mexico City, Mexico. The sculpture was gifted by the city's French community to commemorate the centenary of Mexican independence.

References

External links
 

Cultural depictions of Louis Pasteur
Monuments and memorials in Mexico City
Outdoor sculptures in Mexico City
Sculptures of men in Mexico
Statues in Mexico City